Edmund von Trompowsky (16 March 1851 – 19 January 1919) was a Baltic German architect working mainly in present-day Latvia.

Edmund von Trompowsky studied civil engineering and architecture at Riga Polytechnical Institute (today Riga Technical University) and graduated in 1878. Until 1879 he then ran his own architectural firm in Vitebsk Governorate but by 1880 had established himself in Riga. In addition to his work as an architect, he worked as an assessor for several insurance companies. During his career he designed more than 100 apartment buildings in Riga, in addition to industrial and public buildings in the city. He was also active outside of the city, contributing designs for buildings for several smaller towns in present-day Latvia. He also provided designs for larger urban projects in Riga. Most of his buildings are in an eclectic style.

Gallery

References

External links

1851 births
1919 deaths
Baltic-German people
Architects from Riga
Saint-Petersburg State University of Architecture and Civil Engineering alumni